John Law (pronounced  in French in the traditional approximation of Laws, the colloquial Scottish form of the name; 21 April 1671 – 21 March 1729) was a Scottish economist who distinguished money, a means of exchange, from national wealth dependent on trade. He served as Controller General of Finances under the Duke of Orleans, who was regent for the juvenile Louis XV of France. In 1716, Law set up a private Banque Générale in France. A year later it was nationalised at his request and renamed as Banque Royale. The private bank had been funded mainly by John Law and Louis XV; three-quarters of its capital consisted of government bills and government-accepted notes, effectively making it the nation's first central bank. Backed only partially by silver, it was a fractional reserve bank. Law also set up and directed the Mississippi Company, funded by the Banque Royale. Its chaotic collapse has been compared to the 17th-century tulip mania in Holland. The Mississippi bubble coincided with the South Sea bubble in England, which allegedly took ideas from it. Law was a gambler who would win card games by mentally calculating odds. He originated ideas such as the scarcity theory of value and the real bills doctrine. He held that money creation stimulated an economy, paper money was preferable to metal, and dividend-paying shares a superior form of money. The term "millionaire" was coined for beneficiaries of Law's scheme.

Early years

Law was born into a family of Lowland Scots bankers and goldsmiths from Fife; his father, William, had purchased Lauriston Castle, a landed estate at Cramond on the Firth of Forth and was known as Law of Lauriston. On leaving the High School of Edinburgh, Law joined the family business at the age of 14 and studied the banking business until his father died in 1688. He subsequently neglected the firm in favour of extravagant pursuits and travelled to London, where he lost large sums by gambling.

On 9 April 1694, John Law fought a duel with another British dandy, Edward "Beau" Wilson, in Bloomsbury Square, London. Wilson had challenged Law over the affections of Elizabeth Villiers. Law killed Wilson with a single pass and thrust of his sword. He was arrested, charged with murder and stood trial at the Old Bailey. He appeared before the infamously sadistic "hanging judge" Salathiel Lovell and was found guilty of murder and sentenced to death. He was initially incarcerated in Newgate Prison to await execution. His sentence was later commuted to a fine, on the grounds that the killing only amounted to manslaughter. Wilson's brother appealed and had Law imprisoned, but he managed to escape to Amsterdam.

Career

Economic theory and practice

Law urged the establishment of a national bank to create and increase instruments of credit and the issue of banknotes backed by land, gold, or silver. The first manifestation of Law's system came when he had returned to Scotland and contributed to the debates leading to the Treaty of Union 1707. He wrote a pamphlet entitled Two Overtures Humbly Offered to His Grace John Duke of Argyll, Her Majesties High Commissioner, and the Right Honourable the Estates of Parliament (1705) which foreshadowed the ideas he would propose for establishing new systems of finance, paper money and refinancing the national debt in a subsequent tract entitled Money and Trade Considered: with a Proposal for Supplying the Nation with Money (1705). Law's propositions of creating a national bank in Scotland were ultimately rejected, and he left to pursue his ambitions abroad.

He spent ten years moving between France and the Netherlands, dealing in financial speculations. Problems with the French economy presented the opportunity to put his system into practice.

He had the idea of abolishing minor monopolies and private farming of taxes. He would create a bank for national finance and a state company for commerce, ultimately to exclude all private revenue. This would create a huge monopoly of finance and trade run by the state, and its profits would pay off the national debt. The council called to consider Law's proposal, including financiers such as Samuel Bernard, rejected the proposition on 24 October 1715.

Law made his home in Place Louis-le-Grand, a royal square where he hosted and entertained various Parisian nobles. Gaining the attention of such notable people as the Duke of Orleans, Law quickly found himself a regular in high-stakes gambling parties attended by only the most affluent of Paris. His tall stature and elegant dress allowed Law to charm his way across Europe's financial hubs, from Amsterdam to Venice. These travels heavily influenced Law's theories on monetary policy and the importance of paper money as credit. Law's idea of a centralised bank which would deal in a new form of paper money was years ahead of its time. Despite this forward concept, Law still championed mercantilist beliefs with the promotion of monopolistic companies through government charters.

The wars waged by Louis XIV left the country completely wasted, both economically and financially. The resultant shortage of precious metals led to a shortage of coins in circulation, which in turn limited the production of new coins. With the death of Louis XIV seventeen months after Law's arrival, the Duke of Orleans finally presented Law with the opportunity to display his ingenuity. Since, following the devastating War of the Spanish Succession, France's economy was stagnant and her national debt was crippling, Law proposed to stimulate industry by replacing gold with paper credit and then increasing the supply of credit, and to reduce the national debt by replacing it with shares in economic ventures. On 1 May 1716, Law presented a modified version of his centralised bank plan to the Banque Générale which approved a private bank that allowed investors to supply one-fourth of an investment in currency and the other parts in defunct government bonds. The second key feature of the proposal centred on the premise that this private bank was able to issue its own currency backed by Louis d'or. This enabled the currency to be redeemed by the weight of silver from the original deposit instead of the fluctuating value of the livre, which had been devaluing rapidly.

In May 1716 Law set up the Banque Générale Privée ("General Private Bank"), which developed the use of paper money.
It was one of only six such banks to have issued paper money in Europe, joining Sweden, England, Holland, Venice, and Genoa. The bank was nationalised in December 1718 at Law's request.

From this new banking platform, Law was able to pursue the monopoly companies he envisioned by having France bankroll the endeavour with 100 million livres in the form of company stock. The founding of the Mississippi Company, later renamed the Occident Company and eventually part of the Company of the Indies, was financed in the same way as the bank.

In this context the regent, Philippe d'Orléans, appointed Law as Controller General of Finances in 1720, effectively giving him control over external and internal commerce. The rapid ascension of this new global monopoly led to massive speculation and stock prices ballooned to over sixty times their original value.

As Controller General, Law instituted many beneficial reforms, some of which had lasting effect, while others were soon abolished. He tried to break up large land-holdings to benefit the peasants; he abolished internal road and canal tolls; he encouraged the building of new roads, the starting of new industries (even importing artisans but mostly by offering low-interest loans), and the revival of overseas commerce — and indeed industry increased by 60 per cent in two years, and the number of French ships engaged in export went from 16 to 300.

Law helped in 1719 to refinance the French Indies companies. His nephew, Jean Law de Lauriston, was later Governor-General of Pondicherry.

Mississippi Company
Law became the architect of what would later be known as the Mississippi Bubble, an event that would begin with consolidating the trading companies of Louisiana into a single monopoly (The Mississippi Company), and ended with the collapse of the Banque Générale and subsequent devaluing of the Mississippi Company's shares.
In 1719, the French government allowed Law to issue 50,000 new shares in the Mississippi Company at 500 livres with just 75 livres down and the rest due in seventeen additional monthly payments of 25 livres each. The share price rose to 1,000 livres before the second instalment was even due, and ordinary citizens flocked to Paris to participate.
In October 1719 Law's Company lent the French state 1.5 billion livres at 3 per cent to pay off the national debt, a transaction funded by issuing a further 300,000 shares in the company.

Between May and December 1719 the market price of a share rose from 500 to 10,000 livres and continued rising into early 1720, supported by Law's 4 per cent dividend promise. Under rapidly emerging price inflation, Law sought to hold the share price at 9,000 livres in March 1720, and then on 21 May 1720 to engineer a controlled reduction in the value of both notes and the shares, a measure that was itself reversed six days later. 
As the public rushed to convert banknotes to coin, Law was forced to close the Banque Générale for ten days, then limit the transaction size once the bank reopened. But the queues grew longer, the Mississippi Company stock price continued to fall, and food prices soared by as much as 60 per cent.
The fractional reserve ratio was one fifth, and a Royal edict to criminalise the sale of gold was decreed. A later Royal edict decreed that gold coin was illegal, which was soon reversed, leading to 50 people being killed in a stampede. The company's shares were ultimately rendered worthless, and initially inflated speculation about their worth led to widespread financial stress, which saw Law dismissed at the end of 1720 from his sinecure as Controller General and his post as Chief Director of the Banque Générale.

Downfall
Speculation gave way to panic as people flooded the market with future shares trading as high as 15,000 livres per share, while the shares themselves remained at 10,000 livres each. By May 1720, prices fell to 4,000 livres per share, a 73 per cent decrease within a year. The rush to convert paper money to coins led to sporadic bank runs and riots. Squatters now occupied the square of Palace Louis-le-Grand and openly attacked the financiers that inhabited the area. It was under these circumstances and the cover of night that John Law left Paris some seven months later, leaving all of his substantial property assets in France, including the Place Vendôme and at least 21 châteaux which he had purchased over his years in Paris, for the repayment of creditors.

The descent of a relatively unknown man came as fast as his rise, leaving an economic power vacuum. Law's theories live on 300 years later and "captured many key conceptual points which are very much a part of modern monetary theorizing."

Later years
Law moved to Brussels on 22 December 1720 in impoverished circumstances when his properties in France were voluntarily confiscated. He spent the next few years gambling in Rome, Copenhagen and Venice but never regained his former prosperity. Law realised he would never return to France when Orléans died suddenly in 1723 and Law was granted permission to return to London, having been pardoned in 1719. He lived in London for four years and then moved to Venice, where he contracted pneumonia and died poor in 1729. His grave stone is in the San Moisè, Venice.

Cultural references
Sharon Condie and Richard Condie's 1978 National Film Board of Canada (NFB) animated short John Law and the Mississippi Bubble is a humorous interpretation. The film was produced by the NFB at its newly opened Winnipeg studio. It opened in Canadian cinemas starting in September 1979 and was sold to international broadcasters. The film received an award at the Tampere Film Festival.

John Law is the focus of Rafael Sabatini's 1949 novel The Gamester.

John Law is referenced in Voltaire's 'Dictionnaire Philosophique', as part of the entry on reason.

John Law is the subject of the section entitled "Fragment d'un ancien mythologiste" in "Lettre CXLII" of Montesquieu's epistolary novel "Lettres Persanes" published in 1721.

See also
 Assignat, a bank note system of the French Revolution

References

Further reading

Non-fiction
. Includes the entire first lecture on the life of John Law to be delivered by the author at Law's ancestral home of Lauriston Castle, and other accounts of John Law's life and the Mississippi Scheme by some of the most popular writers of the last 250 years, including: Bram Stoker; Washington Irving, Charles Mackay; Adam Smith; and Voltaire.
. A collection of early eighteenth-century political propagandist pamphlets documenting the hysteria surrounding John Law's return to Britain after the collapse of his Mississippi Scheme and expulsion from France. It also contains a very useful chronology and extensive biographical introduction to John Law and the Mississippi Scheme.
. A biography/memoir of John Law's life and how he built his way to becoming an "economist abroad" in France, yet oversaw a debilitating bank run/financial crisis in the early 18th century.
. Contains Defoe's contemporary accounts of the euphoria and excess of the first ever stock market boom unleashed by John Law and his Mississippi Scheme and his remarkable insight into the European economic crises of the 1720s. It includes: The Chimera (1720), The Case of Mr. Law Truly Stated (1721), and Selected Journalism (1719-1722).
 
. A post-war account of John Law.
Lanchester, John, "The Invention of Money: How the heresies of two bankers became the basis of our modern economy", The New Yorker, 5 & 12 August 2019, pp. 28–31.
. A negative account of John Law.
.
. The most extensive account of Law's writings. It is given credit for restoring the reputation of Law as an important economic theorist.
 Pollard, S. "John Law and the Mississippi Bubble." History Today (Sept 1953) 3#9 pp 622–630. 
. An account of the euphoria and wealth John Law created by engineering the first stock market boom, and the despair, poverty and destroyed lives that followed its crash.
 Velde, Francois R. (2003) Government Equity and Money: John Law's System in 1720 France. Available at SSRN: Government Equity and Money: John Law's System in 1720 France or Government Equity and Money: John Law's System in 1720 France

Fiction/satire
 A contemporary satire on the financial crisis in 1720
 A fictionalised biography
. A sympathetic fictionalised account of Law's career as financial adviser to the Duke of Orléans, Regent under Louis XV.
 A costume drama based on John Law's life

External links

John Law on mapforum.com
Project Gutenberg Edition of Fiat Money Inflation in France: How ...
John Law: Proto-Keynesian, by Murray Rothbard

John Law collection at  The Historic New Orleans Collection
 
 

Scottish bankers
Scottish economists
Physiocrats
Economy of France
History of banking
People from Fife
Scottish criminals
Scottish gamblers
Scottish statisticians
British duellists
1671 births
1729 deaths
Recipients of British royal pardons
18th-century Scottish people
17th-century Scottish people
People of the Regency of Philippe d'Orléans
Members of the French Academy of Sciences
People of the Ancien Régime
Deaths from pneumonia in Veneto
French Ministers of Finance
Converts to Roman Catholicism from Calvinism